Superjoint, formerly known as Superjoint Ritual, was an American heavy metal band.

History
The band was formed by Phil Anselmo, Joe Fazzio, and Jimmy Bower in the early 1990s, later to be joined by Hank Williams III and Kevin Bond. They were founded by Anselmo parallel to his membership in Pantera, but became a full-time endeavor a few years later after Pantera's dissolution.

Despite their early 1990s establishment, it was not until a decade later, after the folding of Pantera, that the group recorded any albums. It was then that Superjoint Ritual garnered significant TV exposure on programs such as MTV2's Headbangers Ball and Fuse TV's Uranium.

However, the group's time in the spotlight would prove short lived. A dispute between Anselmo and Fazzio led to the band's eventual split in late 2004, which was confirmed by both Hank Williams III and Jimmy Bower.

The band reunited at the Housecore Horror Film Festival in Austin, Texas in October 2014. For legal reasons, the band performed under the name "Superjoint". Hank Williams III was initially supposed to take part in this first reunion show, but had to bow out due to personal issues.

Although their appearance at Housecore Horror was supposed to be the only reunion show, the band would later perform at Hellfest 2015.

Superjoint released their latest album to date, Caught Up in the Gears of Application, on November 11, 2016, through Housecore Records.

In January 2017, Superjoint played a tour with Battlecross and Child Bite.

In an interview in June 2019, Anselmo mentioned that he was no longer interested in playing with Superjoint. In October 2020, bassist Stephen Taylor said he is unsure if the band is still active. Further interviews with guitarist Jimmy Bower in 2021 confirmed that the band is finished, with no plans to do any further work. Bower cited his and Anselmo's disinterest in working on material related to the band, as well as their existing commitments to Eyehategod and Philip H. Anselmo & The Illegals.

Musical style and influences
Superjoint's style has been described as a mix of sludge metal and hardcore punk. Bands like Venom, Slayer, Celtic Frost, Voivod, and Darkthrone have also been noted as influences. The name "Superjoint Ritual" comes from a lyric in the Darkthrone song "The Pagan Winter". According to Bower, Anselmo wrote 70–80% of the group's music.

Members 
Final lineup
 Phil Anselmo – vocals (1993–2004, 2014–2019), additional guitars (1993–1998, 2002–2004, 2014–2019), lead guitar (1998–2002)
 Jimmy Bower – rhythm guitar (1993–2004, 2014–2019)
 Kevin Bond – lead guitar (2002–2004, 2014–2019), bass (1994–1995)
 Stephen Taylor – bass (2014–2019)
 Jose Gonzalez – drums (2014–2019)

Former
 Michael Haaga – bass (1993–1994, 1995–2002)
 Hank Williams III – bass (2002–2004)
 Joe Fazzio – drums (1993–2004)
 Marzi Montazeri – lead guitar (1993–1994)

 Timeline

Discography

Studio albums 
Use Once and Destroy (2002, Sanctuary Records)
A Lethal Dose of American Hatred (2003, Sanctuary Records)
Caught Up in the Gears of Application (2016, Housecore Records)

Demos 
1995 Demo
1997 Demo

Videography

DVDs 
Live in Dallas, TX 2002 (2002, Sanctuary Visual Entertainment)
Live at CBGB's (2004, Sanctuary Visual Entertainment)

References

External links 
 AllMusic page
 NOLA Underground (New Orleans underground music scene)
 Superjoint page on Philip Anselmo's official site

Heavy metal musical groups from Louisiana
American sludge metal musical groups
Crossover thrash groups
American heavy metal musical groups
American thrash metal musical groups
Musical groups established in 1993
Musical groups disestablished in 2004
Musical groups reestablished in 2014
Musical groups disestablished in 2019